Shenmue: The Animation, also known simply as Shenmue, is a Japanese anime television series based on the Shenmue video game series by Yu Suzuki and published by Sega. A co-production between Crunchyroll and Adult Swim, the series aired from February to May 2022. A Japanese streaming release followed in April 2022. Shortly after its streaming debut in Japan, it was decided that a televised broadcast of the series would commence a month later on Tokyo MX in May 2022. The anime series adapts the storyline of the first two games, Shenmue (1999) and Shenmue II (2001).

Plot
After he witnesses his father's murder at the family dojo, Ryo Hazuki dedicates his life to finding the man responsible – a mission that takes him from the streets of Yokosuka, Japan, to the sprawling metropolis of Hong Kong and beyond. Ryo will learn that larger, mystical forces are at play as he trains to become the ultimate martial artist in his quest for revenge.

Characters
 
 
 An 18-year-old Japanese teenager who goes on a journey to avenge his father.
 
 
 A high-ranking member of the Chi You Men.
 
 
 A mysterious teenager who becomes Ryo's traveling companion.
 
 
 Ryo's close friend.
 
 
 Master Chen's son.
 
 
 A low-ranking member of the Chi You Men.
 
 
 The youngest member of Wuying Ren's gang, the Heavens.
 
 
 A young Chinese woman who can most often be seen around Aberdeen.
 Xiuying Hong / Lishao Tao
 
 A Tai Chi martial artist and master of the Man Mo Temple.
 
 
 The leader of the notorious gang, the Heavens.
 
 
 The leader of the Yellow Heads.

Production and release
The series was announced on September 4, 2020, at the virtual Crunchyroll Expo. The series was directed by Chikara Sakurai, best known for directing the second season of One-Punch Man. Shenmue creator Yu Suzuki was an executive producer on the series. Kento Shimoyama wrote the series' scripts, Kensuke Ishikawa designed the characters, and Kana Shibue composed the music. The series was animated by Telecom Animation Film with production management by Sola Entertainment. The opening theme is "UNDEAD-NOID" performed by Kashitarō Itō, while the ending theme is "Sympathy" performed by Narudora. The series consists of 13 episodes and it aired on Adult Swim's Toonami programming block and was streamed on Crunchyroll from February 6 to May 1, 2022. The English dub of the series was provided by Sentai Filmworks. The series premiered in Japan on multiple streaming services on April 7, 2022. Shortly after its streaming launch in Japan, it was announced that Tokyo MX would begin broadcasting the series a month later starting on May 3, 2022.

According to the producer Yuu Kiyozono, the anime was in development for around two to three years during the time Shenmue III was produced and released. Kiyozono said that the production crew went to Yokosuka to get an accurate feel of the city's streets and atmosphere. Most of the core Japanese voice actors returned from the video games, although some of the cast included new voice actors to appeal to the game's younger fanbase.

Producer Joseph Chou said that Suzuki was heavily involved in the production to plan out the narrative with backstory information that was never implemented in the games. Sakurai added that some free roaming aspects were included with Ryo talking to people in the streets. On October 8, 2021, Shenmues first official trailer was revealed at New York Comic Con. 

On September 28, 2022, Jason DeMarco confirmed that the series would not be renewed for a second season after it was removed from Adult Swim's website.

Episodes

Notes

References

External links
  
  
 

2022 anime television series debuts
Adult Swim original programming
Anime and manga about revenge
Anime television series based on video games
Crunchyroll anime
Crunchyroll Originals
Martial arts anime and manga
Shenmue
Television series set in 1986
Television series set in 1987
TMS Entertainment
Tokyo MX original programming
Toonami
Works based on Sega video games

ja:シェンムー#Webアニメ